A Crime in a School is a 1982 Croatian film directed by Branko Ivanda, starring Zlatko Vitez. The film received the Kodak-Pathé Award for Cinematography at the 29th Pula Film Festival.

Plot
Zlatko Kovač (Zlatko Vitez), a small-town professor of Croatian language, moves to Zagreb to a new job in a gymnasium. He learns that his predecessor, professor Toth, died in the school in suspicious circumstances. One morning, he discovers a dead man in the teachers' staffroom. While the police fail to make progress in solving the case, Kovač finds out that what the two dead men had in common was an event during the student protests of 1968 to which he was himself an accidental witness. He is convinced that the murderer is one of the school's staff and plans to entrap him at the celebration of the school's 30th anniversary.

References

External links
 

1982 films
1980s Croatian-language films
Yugoslav crime drama films
Films based on Croatian novels
Films set in Zagreb
Croatian crime drama films
1982 crime drama films
Films set in schools